Skis.com is an online outdoor retailer that specializes in gear for skiing, snowboarding, and ski clothing. As of 2022, Skis.com now an entity of The-House.com/Camping World (https://www.the-house.com/skis-dotcom).

History
Skis.com was launched in 2005, Summit Sports Inc., parent company of the site has been in the skiing industry since 1990. Skis.com founder Steve Kopitz has been skiing since 1960

The site sells both high-end and closeout merchandise.

Skis was named in the 2009 Internetretailer.com "Hot 100" sites.  Summit Sports Inc was also featured in the Internet Retailer Top 500 for 2010.

Ski-O-Pedia
The site also provides videos, articles, buying guides and sizing charts for selection of skis. The videos offered include "how-to-buy" tutorials and reviews of the products.

Skisperience
The site has run an annual contest entitled Skisperience the last two seasons. The contest offers entrants the ability to win a ski package and vacation prize package. Past prizes have included a meet and greet with the Rossignol ski company staff, a round trip flight to Canyons Resort in Utah, as well as ski apparel and accessories.

References

External links
Official website

Online retailers of the United States
Retail companies established in 2005
Sporting goods retailers of the United States